Decio Klettenberg (born 19 June 1902, date of death unknown) was a Brazilian rower. He competed in the men's coxed pair event at the 1936 Summer Olympics.

References

1902 births
Year of death missing
Brazilian male rowers
Olympic rowers of Brazil
Rowers at the 1936 Summer Olympics
Place of birth missing